Tucales pastranai is a species of beetle in the family Cerambycidae. It was described by Prosen in 1954. It is known from Argentina and Brazil.

References

Compsosomatini
Beetles described in 1954